Intelsat 805 is a communications satellite operated by Intelsat. Launched in 1998 it was operated in geostationary orbit at a longitude of 55.5 degrees west for around 14 years.

Launch
The launch of Intelsat 805 made use of an Atlas II rocket flying from Cape Canaveral Air Force Station, Florida, United States. The launch took place at 22:48 UTC on June 18, 1998, with the spacecraft entering a geosynchronous transfer orbit. Intelsat 805 subsequently fired its apogee motor to achieve geostationary orbit.

Technical details

References

Intelsat satellites
Spacecraft launched in 1998